Segudet is a village in Andorra, located in the parish of Ordino.

Populated places in Andorra
Ordino